Zoë Nathenson (born 1969) is a British actress.
In 1986, at the age of 17, she performed as daughter of Bob Hoskins in the film Mona Lisa. Nathenson operates her own film acting school.

Filmography

External links
 
 Homepage Zoë Nathenson School of Film Acting

1969 births
Living people
British film actresses